Shaheed Minar (literally, martyrs' monument) may refer to:

 Shaheed Minar, Dhaka, Bangladesh, dedicated to those killed during the 1952 Bengali Language Movement
 Shaheed Minar, Kolkata, India, dedicated to Indian freedom fighters